Charles Rampelberg (11 October 1909 – 18 March 1982) was a French cyclist who competed in the 1932 Summer Olympics. He won a bronze medal in the time trial event.

References

1909 births
1982 deaths
Sportspeople from Tourcoing
French male cyclists
Olympic cyclists of France
Cyclists at the 1932 Summer Olympics
Olympic bronze medalists for France
Olympic medalists in cycling
Medalists at the 1932 Summer Olympics
Cyclists from Hauts-de-France
20th-century French people